Nasty Boys is a TV drama film aired on NBC in September 1989.

Synopsis
The film was about a North Las Vegas narcotic unit of six undercover police officers who fought crimes against drugs and illegal automatic weapons. It became a TV series the following year.

References

External links

1989 films
1980s crime drama films
American crime drama films
Films directed by Rick Rosenthal
Films scored by Basil Poledouris
1989 drama films
American drama television films
1980s English-language films
1980s American films